ExcelAire, LLC is a United States air charter company based at Long Island MacArthur Airport in Ronkonkoma, New York. ExcelAire LLC specializes in worldwide jet and helicopter charters, aircraft management, maintenance and aircraft sales.

Founded in 1993 by Bob Sherry, ExcelAire is currently headed by his son Robert Sherry Jr., its president. ExcelAire is a division of Hawthorne Global Aviation Services and its headquarters is housed in 200,000 square feet of hangar space at MacArthur Airport.

Fleet

As of April 2022, ExcelAire had 7 Aircraft

Incidents
On September 29, 2006, a Embraer Legacy 600 on a delivery flight by ExcelAire and piloted by Jean Paul Paladino and Joseph Lepore was involved in a mid-air collision with Gol Transportes Aéreos Flight 1907. All 154 people on board the Gol Boeing 737 were killed, but everyone on the Legacy jet survived. At the time it was Brazil's deadliest aviation crash, surpassing VASP Flight 168 and surpassed by TAM Airlines Flight 3054 at Congonhas-São Paulo Airport on July 17, 2007. After investigation by the FAA and Brazilian authorities, it was found by the FAA that the pilots Joe Lepore and Jan Paladino had turned the TCAS off, allowing the two aircraft to get on a collision course that caused the crash.

On February 2, 2022, a Pilatus PC-12 registration N357JK operated by ExcelAire collided with and damaged the nose and right wing of a parked British Aerospace 125, registration N207K. The accident is under investigation by the FAA.

References

External links
ExcelAire, LLC
Hawthorne Global Aviation Services
Wired.Com - U.S. Detailed Comments on Draft Final Report of Aircraft Accident Involving PR-GTD and N600XL
NTSB Press Release - Update on Brazilian investigation into September mid-air collision over Amazon Jungle

Airlines based in New York (state)
Charter airlines of the United States
Airlines established in 1985